Joel Peissig is an American film director. He signed to Ridley Scott Associates production company in 2001. He was in the New Directors Showcase at the Cannes Lions International Advertising Festival of 2002. He is widely known for his award-winning Resfest music video of Frou Frou's "Dumbing Down of Love" (2003), and in 2005 he directed the video for Imogen Heap's Grammy nominated single "Hide and Seek".

External links 
Joel Peissig Official Website
Ridley Scott Associates

Year of birth missing (living people)
Living people
Place of birth missing (living people)
American film editors